Brenda Rose Bedford (née Sawyer) (born 1937), is a female former athlete who competed for England.

Athletics career
She represented England in the discus and shot put, at the 1966 British Empire and Commonwealth Games in Kingston, Jamaica.

She later competed at both the 1970 British Commonwealth Games in Edinburgh, Scotland and the 1974 British Commonwealth Games at Christchurch, New Zealand.

In addition she took part in the 1968 European Indoor Games, in Madrid and at the 1969 European Athletics Championships, in Athens and was six times English champion (1966, 1967, 1969, 1973, 1975, 1977) and five times English indoor champion (1967, 1969, 1971, 1973, 1975).

References

1937 births
English female discus throwers
Athletes (track and field) at the 1966 British Empire and Commonwealth Games
Athletes (track and field) at the 1970 British Commonwealth Games
Athletes (track and field) at the 1974 British Commonwealth Games
Living people
English female shot putters
Commonwealth Games competitors for England